Redcar is a constituency represented in the House of Commons of the UK Parliament since 2019 by Jacob Young, a Conservative.

History
The constituency was created in 1974 and was held by the Labour Party from then until 2019, except during a period between 2010 and 2015 when it was held by the Liberal Democrats. In the 2019 General Election, Redcar was the largest Labour majority overturned by the Conservatives, being represented since by a Conservative MP.

Boundaries

1974–1983: The County Borough of Teesside wards of Coatham, Eston Grange, Kirkleatham, Ormesby, Redcar, and South Bank.

1983–1997: The Borough of Langbaurgh wards of Bankside, Church Lane, Coatham, Dormanstown, Eston, Grangetown, Kirkleatham, Newcomen, Normanby, Ormesby, Overfields, Redcar, South Bank, Teesville, and West Dyke.

1997–2010: The Borough of Langbaurgh-on-Tees wards of Coatham, Dormanstown, Eston, Grangetown, Kirkleatham, Longbeck, Newcomen, Normanby, Ormesby, Redcar, St Germain's, South Bank, Teesville, and West Dyke.

2010–present: The Borough of Redcar and Cleveland wards of Coatham, Dormanstown, Eston, Grangetown, Kirkleatham, Longbeck, Newcomen, Normanby, Ormesby, St Germain's, South Bank, Teesville, West Dyke, and Zetland.

The Redcar constituency on the Cleveland coast is formed from parts of the Redcar and Cleveland district.

It takes its name from the coastal resort of Redcar although much of the population lives in the traditionally solid Labour areas between Redcar and Middlesbrough (such as Grangetown, Eston, Normanby, Ormesby and South Bank).  It also includes Dormanstown, Kirkleatham and Marske-by-the-Sea. Once held by the former Secretary of State for Northern Ireland Mo Mowlam, the seat was gained by the Liberal Democrats in the 2010 general election on a massive 21.8% swing from Labour, the largest swing in England since the Second World War outside of by-elections. In 2015, however, the sitting MP Ian Swales did not seek re-election, and Labour regained the seat on another huge swing of 18.9% away from the Liberal Democrats, who polled just ahead of UKIP with the Conservatives in fourth. In 2019, the seat was one of a number of long standing Labour seats in the north of England which fell to the Conservatives.

Constituency profile
The constituency had a slightly higher unemployment at the end of 2012 than the North-East average. However, it had a significantly lower claimant count, owing to its exports and manufacturing industry, than nearby Middlesbrough. Average incomes based on the latest income (2001 census figures) available, are not markedly lower than the national average.

Members of Parliament

Elections

Elections in the 2010s

Elections in the 2000s

Elections in the 1990s

Elections in the 1980s

Elections in the 1970s

See also
 List of parliamentary constituencies in Cleveland
 History of parliamentary constituencies and boundaries in Cleveland

Notes

References

Parliamentary constituencies in North East England
Constituencies of the Parliament of the United Kingdom established in 1974